Milka Ivić (11 December 1923 – 7 March 2011) was a Serbian linguist.

She was born in Belgrade. She took her doctorate in 1954 with the thesis Značenja srpskohrvatskoga instrumentala i njihov razvoj (The Meanings of Serbo-Croatian Instrumental and Their Development), and became a professor of Serbian and Croatian language at the University of Novi Sad. She was especially known for her book Pravci u lingvistici (Trends [Movements] in Linguistics). She was a member of the Norwegian Academy of Science and Letters from 1976, a corresponding member of the Slovenian Academy of Sciences and Arts from 1983, and a member of the Serbian Academy of Sciences and Arts.

She was married to Pavle Ivić.

References

1923 births
2011 deaths
People from Belgrade
Linguists from Serbia
Academic staff of the University of Novi Sad
Members of the Serbian Academy of Sciences and Arts
Members of the Norwegian Academy of Science and Letters
Members of the Slovenian Academy of Sciences and Arts